Trepobates knighti is a species of water strider in the family Gerridae. It is found in the central United States from Texas and Louisiana north to South Dakota, Minnesota, and Illinois.

References

Trepobatinae
Insects described in 1928